Wray-with-Botton is a civil parish in the City of Lancaster district and the English county of Lancashire. In 2001 it had a population of 521, increasing to 532 at the Census 2011. The parish includes the village of Wray. Wray is the home of the annual scarecrow festival on the 1st Monday in May every year.

See also

Listed buildings in Wray-with-Botton
Holy Trinity Church, Wray

References

External links

 Wray village website

Civil parishes in Lancashire
Geography of the City of Lancaster
Forest of Bowland